My Cloud Grocer (or MCG) is a grocery eCommerce software platform for the supermarket chains. It was founded by Yehuda Vernik and Dan Dashevsky in 2012.

History 
They created an online platform solution that enables larger single stores and bigger supermarket chains to offer all of their products via the virtual storefront. The platform is designed for supermarkets to integrate their brick and mortar stores into an online environment. Their main offices are based in Brooklyn, New York, where they launched their first client in the year 2013.

Since 2012, MCG has created white label grocery eCommerce websites for stores such as Breadberry, Grand & Essex market, Rockland Supermarket, Western Kosher, Seasons, The Market Place and SuperStop, among others.

It works by enabling customers to purchase grocery online from their favorite supermarket and choosing either in-store pick up or home delivery. Supermarket then fulfills that order using MCG's software which integrates with store's POS, credit card processor, and delivery vehicles.

In 2017, MCG was named one of the top 10 Retail Cloud Solution Providers by Retail CIO Outlook.

In July 2019, MCG partnered with Truno, a national leader in integrated retail technology solutions, to provide brick-and-mortar grocers the opportunity to compete in the online grocery space.

See also
 Online grocer
 List of online grocers

References 

Online grocers